The 1982 Men's FIH Hockey Junior World Cup was the 2nd edition of the Men's FIH Hockey Junior World Cup, the triennial men's under-21 field hockey world championship organized by the International Hockey Federation. It was held at the Tun Abdul Razak Stadium in Kuala Lumpur, Malaysia from 14 to 28 August 1982.

Pakistan were the defending champions but lost to Australia in the semifinals. West Germany won their first title by defeating Australia in the final.

Teams
Alongside the host nation, Malaysia, a further ten teams qualified for the event. 

 (defending champions)

Results

Preliminary round

Pool A

Pool B

Classification round

Ninth to eleventh place classification

Crossover

Ninth and tenth place

Fifth to eighth place classification

Crossover

Seventh and Eighth place

Fifth and sixth place

First to fourth place classification

Semi-finals

Third and fourth place

Final

Final standings

See also
1982 Men's FIH World Cup

References

External links
International Hockey Federation

Hockey Junior World Cup
Junior World Cup
International field hockey competitions hosted by Malaysia
FIH Hockey Junior World Cup
FIH Hockey World Cup
FIH Hockey Junior World Cup
Sports competitions in Kuala Lumpur